NerdWallet is an American personal finance company, founded in 2009 by Tim Chen and Jacob Gibson. It has a website and app that earns money by promoting financial products to its users.

History
NerdWallet was founded in August 2009 by Tim Chen and Jacob Gibson, with an initial capital investment of $800.  Its first product was a web application that provided comparative information about credit cards. Subsequently, it generated large quantities of content to help boost its search engine results. Website traffic grew quickly in 2010 and, by March 2014, the website had up to 30 million users. The following year, it raised $64 million in its first round of funding, at an estimated valuation of $500 million.

In 2016, the company acquired the retirement planning firm AboutLife, and was valued at $520 million. In 2017, company growth slowed, resulting in the layoff of 11 percent of its employees.

In August 2020, the company expanded its footprint into the UK by acquiring Know Your Money, a Norwich-based startup that provides a similar range of comparison and information tools geared at people who live in the UK In November 2020, NerdWallet acquired small business loan marketplace, Fundera. 
In 2021, NerdWallet partnered with Inclusiv, a nonprofit network of community development credit unions, and committed to move millions of dollars to local credit unions to advance financial equity. In November 2021, the company went public on the Nasdaq stock exchange.

In July 2022, NerdWallet acquired On the Barrelhead, a consumer debt robo-advisor platform, for $120 million.

Products and services
The company's goal is to provide information that educates users in making financial decisions. They do so by providing both reviews and comparison of different financial products, including credit cards, banking, investing, loans and insurance. Its web site is directed primarily towards Millennials and provides information on credit card selection and benefits, college loans, banking, mortgage loans, stock trading and insurance policies.

By May 2015, the company developed business relationships with eight banks and a dozen insurance companies.  In exchange for new customers, affiliated banks pay NerdWallet a success fee. Co-founder Chen reported that the company became profitable by virtue of the fees it earned through matching users with financial products and services.

Administration
Tim Chen is the CEO and co-founder of NerdWallet and board member at the National Foundation for Credit Counseling.  The company's "transparent" and "self-critical" management style was reset in 2013, when Chen fired 20% of the workforce and restructured company management into a flatter "matrix" structure.

In March 2014, former LinkedIn VP Dan Yoo replaced co-founder Gibson as chief operating officer and Flo Thinh joined as VP of Talent. By 2015, the company had 200 employees and added Vikram Pandit and James D. Robinson III to its board of advisors.

In 2020, former eBay executive Lauren St. Clair joined NerdWallet as CFO. The company added Lynne Laube and Jennifer Ceran to its board of directors.

See also
 Bankrate
 CreditKarma
 LendingTree
 SuperMoney

References

External links 
 
 App Download: Play Store

2009 establishments in California
American companies established in 2009
Companies based in San Francisco
Financial services companies based in California
Finance websites
Financial services companies established in 2009
Online financial services companies of the United States
Financial technology companies
Personal finance education
2021 initial public offerings
Companies listed on the Nasdaq